, known as Magma Man in some markets, is a Japanese tokusatsu television series about the titular superhero who fights kaiju and other villains. Produced by Tsuburaya Productions, the show was broadcast on Nippon Television from January 7 to July 31, 1973, with a total of 30 episodes. This was also one of several shows Tsuburaya did to celebrate the company's 10th anniversary (the other two being Ultraman Taro and Jumborg Ace).

Plot
A strange phenomenon happened throughout the world, causing giant, mutant dinosaurs to suddenly appear. The people of the Aban continent, living underground for the last 12,000 years sends a courageous young man named Misaki to live as an archeologist and SAF (Scientific Attack Force) agent Daisuke Misaki. Whenever monsters and space aliens attack the world, Misaki transforms into Fireman by using the fire-stick, and defends the human race against them.

Cast
 Naoya Makoto as Daisuke Misaki / Fireman
 Goro Mutsumi as Dr. Gunpachi Umino
 Shin Kishida as Dr.Saburo Mizusima
 Kishida wrote screenplays ep.12 as Shin Akegawa.
 Sei Hiraizumi as Dr. Futoshi Chiba
 Keiko Kunihara as Mariko Hayama
 Mitsuru Saijō as Fireman (Suit Acting)
 Voice of Fireman by Michihiro Ikemizu
 Narrated by Ichirō Murakoshi

Staff 
Producers

 Akira Tsuburaya
 Kimihiko Eto (Mannensha)
 Yoshikazu Morita (NTV)

Script
 Bunzo Wakatsuki
 Fumito Imamura
 Toyohiro Ando
 Shin Kishida
 Ikuko Okamoto
Music
 Toru Fuyuki
Theme Song by
 Asei Kobayashi 
 Bob Sakuma
Directors of Photography
 Toshiyuki Machida
 Koji Yokote
Lighting
 Masanori Ando
Production Designed by
 Osamu Yamaguchi
Assistant Directors
 Hiroshi Okamoto
 Toshihiko Nakajima

VFX Unit 
Cameraman
 Yuzo Kaneko
Lighting
 Eihachi Kubo
 Yukio Ito
 Nagaharu Watanabe
 Shoichi Uehara
 Masao Ohara
 Shinichi Fujino
Art Directors & Monster Design
 Senkatsu Ikeya, Kazumasa Otani
Assistant Directors
 Shiya Nakamura
 Masao Kobayashi
 Isao Matsumoto
 Masahiro Ito
 Seishiro Kameda
 Setsuo Mizunuma
Wire Operators
 Rumichi Kumazawa, Isamu Morohoshi, Haruo Sekiya
Special Effects
 Masamichi Takayama
VFX
 Minoru Nakano
Scripter Girls
 Yuko Morita
 Isao Matsumoto
 Mayumi Nakamachi
 Masahiro Ito
 Haruyo Matsumaru
 Setsuo Mizunuma
 Seishiro Kameda
 Miyo Tabata
Production Chiefs
 Takahiro Katagiri
 Yukio Ohno
 Masana Takahashi
Editing by
 Toyo Suzuki, Tatsuharu Nakashizuka, Sachiko Yamaji, Junko Yoneuchiyama
Effects
 Akira Kojima, Makoto Ishida
Sound Recording
 Kisaburo Goda, Hideo Okuyama
In Charge of Production
 Masayuki Shitara
Post Production Manager
 Teruyoshi Kokubo
Music Selecting by
 Kiyoshi Suzuki
 Masami Hara
Production Contacting
 Hiroshi Saito
Special Thanks
 Miyazaki Transportation, Nippon Car Ferry Co., Ltd.
Devices
 Isamu Sugimoto
Post Production
 Den Film Effects
Film Processing
 Tokyo Laboratory
Special Technology
 Kazuo Sagawa, Junkichi Oki, Masao Kobayashi, Iwataro Ishii, Shiya Nakamura
Directed by
 Junkichi Oki, Koji Otsuka, Tatsumi Ando, Toshiki Suzuki, Taiji Saeki, Hiromi Higuchi, Hiroshi Okamoto
Produced by
 Tsuburaya Productions
 Mannensha
 Nippon TV

Songs

Opening song
 
 Lyrics: Yū Aku
 Composition: Asei Kobayashi
 Arrangement: Bob Sakuma
 Artists: Masato Shimon

Other songs
  
 Lyrics: Hajime Tsuburaya(as Kyouichi Azuma)
 Composition and Arrangement: Tōru Fuyuki
 Artists: Columbia Yurikago-kai and The Photons

 
 Lyrics: Kyouichi Azuma
 Composition and Arrangement: Tōru Fuyuki
 Artists: Masato Shimon with The Photons

 
 Lyrics: Mieko Arima
 Composition and Arrangement: Go Misawa
 Artists: Masato Shimon

List of episodes

References

External links 
Official Site  (Japanese)

Tsuburaya Productions
1973 Japanese television series debuts
1973 Japanese television series endings
Nippon TV original programming
Tokusatsu television series
Ultra television series